The Blue Rider (German: Der Blaue Reiter) is an oil painting executed in Bavaria in 1903 by the Russian emigré artist Wassily Kandinsky. It is now held in a private collection in Zurich, and shares its name with the art movement he would co-found with Franz Marc in the early 1910s.

Background
Kandinsky was born in Moscow in 1866, the only son of a tea merchant. When his parents divorced, he was sent to live with an aunt; it was his life there when he first discovered the magic of colours. At university, he decided to study Economics and Law, passing his exams "with ease". Shortly after marrying his cousin, after seeing one in Monet's series of paintings Haystacks, he was faced with a dilemma to be either a professor, or to begin a career as an artist. He decided to learn painting, and thus, in 1896, the thirty-year-old went to Munich, Germany.

Description
It depicts a horseman in a blue cloak galloping through a meadow on a white horse with a forest in the background. The painting itself is unremarkable, but represented an important milestone on Kandinsky's artistic transition from impressionism to modern abstract art, of which he was one of the pioneers. It was one of his last impressionist works and contains early signs of the abstractionism that would become his forte. The color blue in particular was to have a spiritual significance for the artist, as it did to his German painter friend Marc.

The other significance of the work is that it shared its German title (Der Blaue Reiter) with the name of the group of progressive artists co-founded by Kandinsky in 1911, which published an almanac and organised exhibitions of their work.

See also
List of paintings by Wassily Kandinsky
Der Blaue Reiter
Alexej von Jawlensky
Expressionism

References

External links 

1903 paintings
Paintings by Wassily Kandinsky
Horses in art